8 is Do As Infinity's fourth video collection.

Video track listing
 
 "Under the Sun"
 "Under the Moon"
 
 
 
 
 
 
 "Field of Dreams" (bonus clip)

References

External links
 8 at Avex Network

Do As Infinity video albums
2004 video albums
Music video compilation albums
2004 compilation albums